William James Beadel (1828 – 5 April 1892) was a British Conservative Party politician.

He was elected at the 1885 general election as member of parliament (MP) for the newly created Chelmsford Division of Essex, and held the seat until his death in 1892, aged 79.

References

External links 
 

1828 births
1892 deaths
Conservative Party (UK) MPs for English constituencies
UK MPs 1885–1886
UK MPs 1886–1892